Luke Clippinger (born September 24, 1972) is an American politician and lawyer from Maryland. A Democrat, he was elected to the Maryland House of Delegates in 2010, representing the state's 46th district in Baltimore. He took office on January 12, 2011.

Early life and career
Born in Baltimore on September 24, 1972, Clippinger was raised in Reservoir Hill and attended Baltimore City Public Schools, namely Roland Park Elementary-Middle School and Baltimore Polytechnic Institute. Clippinger graduated in 1994 from Earlham College in Richmond, Indiana with a major in politics; at Earlham, he ran the campus radio station. He involved himself in local politics, running the reelection campaign of Congressman Lee H. Hamilton (D–Indiana) and subsequently spending seven years serving as district director for Congressman Baron Hill (D–Indiana).

Clippinger later attended the University of Louisville School of Law in Kentucky. After law school, he returned to Baltimore to work as an Assistant State's Attorney in Anne Arundel County.

Political career

2010 primary election
Clippinger mounted a bid for the Maryland House of Delegates in 2010, running in the three-member 46th district (south and southeast Baltimore). Incumbent Carolyn J. Krysiak had decided against seeking reelection, creating an open seat in the 46th.

Six Democrats filed for delegate and Clippinger was invited onto the ticket of incumbent Sen. George Della and incumbent Dels. Peter A. Hammen and Brian K. McHale. In the Democratic primary election held on September 14, Clippinger placed third, surpassed only by the two incumbents seeking reelection. He finished 642 votes ahead of the fourth-placed finisher and thus won the Democratic nomination, proceeding to the general election.
{| class="wikitable"
|-
!Name
!Votes
!Percent
!Outcome
|-
|- 
|Peter A. Hammen (incumbent)
|5,632
|  26.0%
|   Won
|-
|- 
|Brian K. McHale (incumbent)
|4,128
|  19.0%
|   Won
|-
|- 
|Luke Clippinger
|4,052
|  18.7%
|   Won
|-
|- 
|Bill Romani
|3,410 
|  15.7%
|   Lost
|-
|- 
|Jason Filippou
|2,503
|  11.5%
|   Lost
|-
|- 
|Melissa A. Techentin
|1,962 
|  9.0%
|   Lost
|}

2010 general election
In the general election, the three Democratic nominees faced only token opposition in a district that's overwhelmingly Democratic. They won easily.
{| class="wikitable"
|-
!Name
!Votes
!Percent
!Outcome
|-
|- 
|Peter A. Hammen, Democratic
|15,367
|  29.6%
|   Won
|-
|- 
|Brian K. McHale, Democratic
|14,871
|  28.6%
|   Won
|-
|- 
|Luke Clippinger, Democratic
|14,159
|  27.3%
|   Won
|-
|- 
|Roger Bedingfield, Republican
|7,338 
|  14.1%
|   Lost
|}

In the legislature
On January 12, 2011, Clippinger was sworn in as a member of the Maryland House of Delegates and was assigned to the House Judiciary committee where he initially served for 4 years. During the 2013 session he co-sponsored HB 860 (Baltimore City Public Schools Construction and Revitalization Act of 2013). Signed by the Governor on May 16, 2013, the new law approved 1.1 billion dollars to construct new schools in Baltimore City. In 2015 he moved to the House Economic Matters committee where he served on its worker's compensation subcommittee. Also in 2015 he was selected to be the House Chair of the Democratic Party Cauacus.

In 2019 Clippinger returned the House Judiciary Committee as its chairman.

Personal
Clippinger is openly gay. He is one of eight openly LGBT members of the Maryland General Assembly, alongside Sen. Rich Madaleno (D–Kensington) and Dels. Maggie McIntosh (D–Baltimore), Mary L. Washington (D–Baltimore), Anne Kaiser (D–Burtonsville), Heather Mizeur (D–Takoma Park), Peter Murphy (D–Bryans Road) and Bonnie Cullison (D–Silver Spring).

He is an Elder at Brown Memorial Presbyterian Church, Park Avenue. He has been a member since 1986.

References

External links
Biography courtesy of the Maryland State Archives
Campaign website

Living people
1972 births
Gay politicians
LGBT state legislators in Maryland
Democratic Party members of the Maryland House of Delegates
Earlham College alumni
University of Louisville School of Law alumni
American Presbyterians
Baltimore Polytechnic Institute alumni
21st-century American politicians